Plodršnica (in older sources also Ploderšnica) is a small settlement in the Slovene Hills southeast of Šentilj v Slovenskih Goricah in the Municipality of Šentilj in northeastern Slovenia.

References

External links
Plodršnica on Geopedia

Populated places in the Municipality of Šentilj